Cotana unistrigata is a moth in the family Eupterotidae. It was described by George Thomas Bethune-Baker in 1904. It is found in New Guinea.

The wingspan is 39–43 mm. The forewings are ochre-brown with a broad dark grey-brown nearly straight stripe across the wing, beyond the centre, from the costa to the inner margin. The hindwings are ochre-yellow with an oblique dark stripe right across the wing rather in front of the centre.

References

Moths described in 1904
Eupterotinae